The 1986 Stanford Cardinal football team represented Stanford University in the 1986 NCAA Division I-A football season. In head coach Jack Elway's third season at Stanford, the Cardinal had its first winning season since 1980 and received its first post-season bowl invitation since 1978.

The team played their home games at Stanford Stadium in Stanford, California and competed in the Pacific-10 Conference.

Schedule

Roster

Season summary

at California

1987 NFL Draft

References

Stanford
Stanford Cardinal football seasons
Stanford Cardinal football